Federal Route 80, or Jalan Sepakat, is the main federal road in Perlis, Malaysia.

Route background 
The Kilometre Zero of the Federal Route 80 starts at Kuala Sanglang.

Features

At most sections, the Federal Route 80 was built under the JKR R5 road standard, with a speed limit of 90 km/h.

Major intersections 
The entire route is in Perlis, Malaysia.

References

080